(pronounced ), literally 'over-foreignization', is a German-language term used in politics to suggest an excess of immigration.  The word is a nominalization compounded from über meaning 'over' or 'overly' and  meaning 'foreign'.

Political uses
The German term has had several meanings over the years, all of which have reflected the sense of "too foreign" and "threatening", and are generally negative.

Successive editions of the Duden dictionary illustrate how the meaning has changed since the term was first used in 1929, then meaning "taking on too much foreign money" (especially loans made from 1924–1929 to rebuild Germany, following the First World War). In 1934 (one year after the NSDAP came to power in Germany), the meaning changed to "immigration/imposition of foreign races", and in 1941 it became "immigration/imposition of foreign peoples". Following the Second World War, the 1951/1952 version of the Duden returned to the strictly economic definition. In 1961, the term foreigner came to replace foreign races or foreign peoples. In 1986, the term was no longer used in economics. Since 1991, primarily the verb  has been in use, and one could speak of a country being .

Linguists, philologists, political scientists and social scientists criticise the concept for its vagueness, its use under national socialism, and its continuing negative connotation.

See also
 Xenophobia
 Aporophobia
 Nativism
 LTI - Lingua Tertii Imperii
 James Schwarzenbach
 Illegal immigration from Africa to Israel

References

German words and phrases
Immigration to Switzerland
Immigration to Germany
Anti-immigration politics in Europe